The Bonneville Hotel, on the 400 block of W. C St. in Idaho Falls in Bonneville County, Idaho, was built in 1927.  It was listed on the National Register of Historic Places in 1984.

It is a five-story, brick-veneered hotel which was built in 1927 and was remodeled in 1951.  The brick is pale to dark burnt red in shade, and is laid in common bond.

References

External links

Hotel buildings on the National Register of Historic Places in Idaho
Hotel buildings completed in 1927
Bonneville County, Idaho
Hotels in Idaho